The Plus-Minus Award is given annually to the player who finishes with the top plus/minus in the Western Hockey League.  It has been awarded since 1987.

List of winners

See also
AutoPro Plaque - Quebec Major Junior Hockey League Plus-Minus award (defunct)

References

Western Hockey League trophies and awards